Sekolah Menengah Kebangsaan Padang Tembak (English:Riffle Field National High School or Padang Tembak National High School) is one of the Malaysia 
government's High School (public) located at Jalan Sultan Yahya Petra. (Formerly Jalan Semarak / Jalan Henry Gurney), Kuala Lumpur. Grade level of learning in the school is from form 1 to form 5. The school also under Keramat PKG Zone (Non-Keramat Zone JPWP).

History

Early history
The school was originally known as the School Police Depot (SMKPD). School sessions started in 1965. The school was formed with the aim to educate and provide education to children around the army camps and police depot being located close to military camps and the police depot in Jalan Semarak, Kuala Lumpur (formerly known as Jalan Gurney). At first the school site was under the State of Selangor and later placed under the Federal Territory of Kuala Lumpur in 1974.

The building was originally only staying in the National Primary School Police Depot. In the early years the school had 140 students and  accepted students form one and the men. Because staying at the Police National Primary Depot it ran only in the evening  with four classrooms. There were eight teachers including principals. Principal of the school was Mr Yusuf bin Hassan.

After about a year the number of students increased and a building was required. On July 4, 1966, Police Depot High School building completed and the school moved to it with 247 people from level 1 and 2, with 14 teachers. In 1967, pupils took the Depot Police Secondary School Certificate of Primary Education examination for the first time.

In 1968, the 648 school students were in levels level 1 to 4. In January 1969, pupils up to Form 4 to Form 5 were moved to the Aminuddin Baki Secondary School in Kampung Pandan, Kuala Lumpur because of the shortage of teachers, teaching facilities and equipment, especially for science. In 1970, in the absence of level 4 and 5 students, there were 422 students.

In December 1971, Toh Puan Hajah Siti Zainab bt Haji Baharuddin became the first female head. He is also the wife of the former President of Penang. After nearly a year working in the school, in 1972 he renamed it vas the School of Police Depot Rifle High School, Kuala Lumpur (SMKPTKL). At the same time the school accepted female students, and embarked on two flows in the medium of Malay and English.

In 1977, for the first time, pupils sat the Malaysian Certificate of Education (MCE) and Sijil Pelajaran Malaysia (SPM). The number of pupils had increased to 1500 people in the same year. In 1977 SMKPTKL had only one stream only, i.e. the medium of Malay.

After 15 years of its establishment SMKPTKL was opened by on June 23, 1981, by the Honourable Datuk Seri Mohd Najib bin Tun Abdul Razak, who was Deputy Minister of Education Malaysia at the time. On 20 November 1988, Jalan Gurney SMPTKL SMKPTKL changed to Jalan Semarak in conjunction with the assembly stage Semarak Federal Territory of Kuala Lumpur.

2010

The school has six blocks with 68 classrooms including life skills workshops, science laboratories, computer labs, an open hall, administrative offices and others. The school has two sessions of level 1 and 2 in the afternoon session, while levels 3, 4 and 5 in the morning. Forms 1 and 2 Standing Standing still in the morning session for this class is a special class of Class Skills follow the Quran and Arabic.
The school has a library room. The present library was visited by YAB Datuk Seri Mohd Najib Tun Abdul Razak in conjunction with the opening SMKPTKL on June 23, 1981. 
In sports, the school has a volleyball, hockey, soccer and ping-pong. To carry out the activities of games and sports, the school divides students into five sport houses. Sports house names are taken from after the name of the positions that never existed in the days of the sultanate of Malacca Chief, Harbour Master, Admiral, Temenggong, and Treasurer.

Extracurricular
This school has  clubs and associations such as Tae Kwando Club, Silat and the Red Crescent Society, Association of English and Malay, Science, Geography, Art, Scouts and Cadet Force. Pupils Cadet Corps was trained by military instructors and military camp Sungai Besi, Kuala Lumpur, on a weekly basis.

School badge

School principal

References

Schools in Kuala Lumpur